William Stevens Fielding,  (November 24, 1848 – June 23, 1929) was a Canadian Liberal politician, the seventh premier of Nova Scotia (1884–96), and the federal Minister of Finance from 1896 to 1911 and again from 1921 to 1925.

Early life

He was born in Halifax, Nova Scotia. Fielding became leader of the Anti-Confederation Party (Nova Scotia Liberal Party). In 1884, he became Premier and won the 1886 election on a pledge to remove Nova Scotia from confederation. When he failed to do this, he turned to economic matters including developing the coal industry.

The Liberal Party of Nova Scotia fared poorly in national elections during the 1880s and early 1890s. The national party advocated policies that would discontinue the national coal subsidy and, for all practical purposes, eliminate Catholic schools in Manitoba, policies disliked by provincial coal miners and Catholics respectively.  Fielding forged a more moderate coal policy and defused the school issue, winning back Catholics. Thus in 1896 the provincial Liberals improved their showing in the national election.

Federal politics

In 1896, he left provincial politics to become Minister of Finance in the Liberal government of Sir Wilfrid Laurier. In 1910, he negotiated a reciprocity or free trade agreement with the United States which led to the government's defeat in the 1911 general election. Fielding lost his seat, and became editor of the Daily Telegraph of Montreal.

First World War

Fielding supported the Unionist government of Sir Robert Borden during the Conscription Crisis of 1917 and returned to the House of Commons as a Liberal-Unionist member.

Liberal leadership convention, 1919

Fielding had widely been seen as Laurier's successor but his split with the party over the conscription issue cost him the 1919 Liberal leadership convention where he lost to William Lyon Mackenzie King by 38 votes.

Service in Mackenzie King's first Administration
He served again as Minister of Finance in King's first government formed after the 1921 election.

Later life

He retired from politics in 1925.

In 1923, Fielding was sworn into the Privy Council of the United Kingdom allowing him to be styled as Right Honourable, a rare privilege among Canadians who have not served as Prime Minister, Governor-General, or Chief Justice of Canada.

He died in Ottawa.

Notes

External links 
 
 

1848 births
1884 in Canada
1929 deaths
Canadian Baptists
Canadian Ministers of Finance
Canadian Ministers of Railways and Canals
Canadian people of English descent
Liberal Party of Canada MPs
Liberal Party of Canada leadership candidates
Liberal-Unionist MPs in Canada
Members of the House of Commons of Canada from Nova Scotia
Canadian members of the Privy Council of the United Kingdom
Members of the King's Privy Council for Canada
Nova Scotia Liberal Party MLAs
People from Halifax, Nova Scotia
Premiers of Nova Scotia
Persons of National Historic Significance (Canada)
19th-century Baptists
Nova Scotia political party leaders